The 2015/16 FIS Freestyle Skiing World Cup was the thirty seventh World Cup season in freestyle skiing organised by International Ski Federation. The season started on 23 August 2015 and ended on 19 March 2016. This season included six disciplines: moguls, aerials, ski cross, halfpipe, slopestyle and big air.

Men

Ski Cross

Moguls

Aerials

Slopestyle/Big Air

Halfpipe

Ladies

Ski Cross

Moguls

Aerials

Slopestyle/Big Air

Halfpipe

Team

Mixed

Men's standings

Overall 

Standings after 35 events.

Moguls 

Standings after 8 races.

Aerials 

Standings after 6 races.

Ski Cross 

Standings after 12 races.

Halfpipe 

Standings after 4 races.

Slopestyle/Big Air 

Standings after 5 races.

Ladies' standings

Overall 

Standings after 35 events.

Moguls 

Standings after 8 races.

Aerials 

Standings after 6 races.

Ski Cross 

Standings after 12 races.

Halfpipe 

Standings after 4 races.

Slopestyle/Big Air 

Standings after 5 races.

Nations Cup 
Source:

Ski Cross 

Standings after 24 events.

Moguls 

Standings after 16 events.

Aerials 

Standings after 12 events.

Slopestyle 

Standings after 8 events.

Halfpipe 

Standings after 8 events.

Overall 

Standings after 68 events.

Men overall 

Standings after 34 events.

Ladies overall 

Standings after 34 events.

Footnotes

References

FIS Freestyle Skiing World Cup
World Cup
World Cup